Edward David Shurtleff (September 19, 1863 – December 14, 1936) was an American jurist and politician.

Born in Genoa, Illinois, Shurtleff studied at Oberlin College. He studied law and was admitted to the Dakota Territory bar and then practiced in what is now the state of South Dakota. In 1894, Shurtleff was admitted to the Illinois bar and practiced law in Marengo, Illinois. Shurtleff served on the McHenry County, Illinois Board of Commissioners and served as mayor of Marengo, Illinois. He also practiced law in Chicago, Illinois. From 1900 until 1919, Shurtleff served in the Illinois House of Representatives and was the speaker of the house from 1905 to 1909. In 1919, Shurtleff was appointed Illinois Circuit Court judge. From 1927 to 1933, Shurtleff served on the Illinois Appellate Court. Shurtleff died at his home in Marengo, Illinois from a heart attack.

Notes

1863 births
1936 deaths
Politicians from Chicago
People from DeKalb County, Illinois
People from Marengo, Illinois
Oberlin College alumni
South Dakota lawyers
Illinois state court judges
Judges of the Illinois Appellate Court
Republican Party members of the Illinois House of Representatives
Mayors of places in Illinois
County commissioners in Illinois
Speakers of the Illinois House of Representatives